The York County Courthouse, built in 1914, is an historic courthouse located at West Liberty and South Congress streets in the city of York in  York County, South Carolina. It was designed in the Classical Revival style by Darlington native William Augustus Edwards who designed eight other South Carolina courthouses as well as academic buildings at 12 institutions in Florida, Georgia and South Carolina. On October 30, 1981, it was added to the National Register of Historic Places.

References

External links 
 York County government website
 National Register listings for York County
 South Carolina Department of Archives and History file on York County Courthouse
 University of Florida biography of William Augustus Edwards

See also
List of Registered Historic Places in South Carolina

County courthouses in South Carolina
William Augustus Edwards buildings
Buildings and structures in York County, South Carolina
Government buildings completed in 1914
National Register of Historic Places in York County, South Carolina
Courthouses on the National Register of Historic Places in South Carolina